Konstantin Ustinovich Chernenko (24 September 1911 – 10 March 1985) was a Soviet politician and the seventh General Secretary of the Communist Party of the Soviet Union. He briefly led the Soviet Union from 13 February 1984 until his death on 10 March 1985.

Born to a poor family from Siberia, Chernenko joined the Komsomol in 1929 and became a full member of the party in 1931. After holding a series of propaganda posts, in 1948 he became the head of the propaganda department in Moldavia, serving under Leonid Brezhnev. After Brezhnev took over as First Secretary of the CPSU in 1964, Chernenko rose to head the General Department of the Central Committee, responsible for setting the agenda for the Politburo and drafting Central Committee decrees. In 1971 Chernenko became a full member of the Central Committee, and in 1978 he was made a full member of the Politburo.

After the death of Brezhnev and his successor Yuri Andropov, Chernenko was elected General Secretary in February 1984 and made Chairman of the Presidium of the Supreme Soviet in April 1984. Due to his rapidly failing health, he was often unable to fulfill his official duties. He died in March 1985 after leading the country for only 13 months, and was succeeded as General Secretary by Mikhail Gorbachev.

Early life and political career

Origins
Chernenko was born to a poor family in the Siberian village of Bolshaya Tes (now in Novosyolovsky District, Krasnoyarsk Krai) on 24 September 1911.

Chernenko joined the Komsomol (Communist Youth League) in 1929. By 1931, he became a full member of the ruling Communist Party. From 1930 to 1933, he served in the Soviet frontier guards on the Soviet–Chinese border. After completing his military service, he returned to Krasnoyarsk as a propagandist. In 1933 he worked in the Propaganda Department of the Novosyolovsky District Party Committee. A few years later he was promoted to head of the same department in Uyarsk Raykom.

Chernenko steadily rose through the Party ranks, becoming the Director of the Krasnoyarsk House of Party Enlightenment before being named Deputy Head of the Agitprop Department of Krasnoyarsk's Territorial Committee in 1939. In the early 1940s, he began a close relationship with Fyodor Kulakov and was named Secretary of the Territorial Party Committee for Propaganda. By 1945, he acquired a diploma from a party training school in Moscow then later finished a correspondence course for schoolteachers in 1953.

Rise to the Soviet leadership

The turning point in Chernenko's career was his assignment in 1948 to head the Communist Party's propaganda department in the Moldavian Soviet Socialist Republic. There, he met and won the confidence of Leonid Brezhnev, the first secretary of the Moldavian branch of the Communist Party from 1950 to 1952 and future leader of the Soviet Union. Chernenko followed Brezhnev in 1956 to fill a similar propaganda post in the CPSU Central Committee in Moscow. In 1960, after Brezhnev was named chairman of the Presidium of the Supreme Soviet (titular head of state of the Soviet Union), Chernenko became his chief of staff.

In 1964, Soviet leader Nikita Khrushchev was deposed, and succeeded by Brezhnev. During Brezhnev's tenure as Party leader, Chernenko's career continued successfully. He was nominated in 1965 as head of the General Department of the Central Committee, and given the mandate to set the Politburo agenda and prepare drafts of numerous Central Committee decrees and resolutions. He also monitored telephone wiretaps and covert listening devices in various offices of the top Party members. Another of his jobs was to sign hundreds of Party documents daily, a job he did for the next 20 years. Even after he became General Secretary of the Party, he continued to sign papers referring to the General Department (when he could no longer physically sign documents, a facsimile was used instead).

In 1971, Chernenko was promoted to full membership in the Central Committee: overseeing Party work over the Letter Bureau, dealing with correspondence. In 1976, he was elected secretary of the Letter Bureau. He became Candidate in 1977, and in 1978 a full member of the Politburo, second to the General Secretary in the Party hierarchy.

During Brezhnev's final years, Chernenko became fully immersed in ideological Party work: heading Soviet delegations abroad, accompanying Brezhnev to important meetings and conferences, and working as a member of the commission that revised the Soviet Constitution in 1977. In 1979, he took part in the Vienna arms limitation talks.

After Brezhnev's death in November 1982, there was speculation that the position of General Secretary would fall to Chernenko, but he was unable to rally enough support for his candidacy within the Party. Ultimately, KGB chief Yuri Andropov, who had been more mindful of Brezhnev's failing health, succeeded to the position.

Leader of the Soviet Union 

Yuri Andropov died on 9 February 1984. Chernenko was then elected to replace Andropov even though the latter stated he wanted Mikhail Gorbachev to succeed him. Additionally, Chernenko was terminally ill himself.

At the time of his ascent to the country's top post, Chernenko was primarily viewed as a transitional leader who could give the Politburo's "Old Guard" time to choose an acceptable candidate from the next generation of Soviet leadership. In the interim, he was forced to govern the country as part of a triumvirate alongside Defense Minister Dmitriy Ustinov and Foreign Minister Andrei Gromyko. This became a growing problem as Chernenko's illness led him to miss meetings with increasing frequency.

At Andropov's funeral, Chernenko could barely read the eulogy. Those present strained to catch the meaning of what he was trying to say. He spoke rapidly, swallowed his words, kept coughing and stopped repeatedly to wipe his lips and forehead. He ascended Lenin's Mausoleum by way of a newly installed escalator and descended with the help of two bodyguards.

Chernenko represented a return to the policies of the late Brezhnev era. Nevertheless, he supported a greater role for the labour unions, and reform in education and propaganda. The one major personnel change Chernenko made was the dismissal of the Chief of the General Staff, Marshal Nikolai Ogarkov. Ogarkov was subsequently replaced by Marshal Sergey Akhromeyev.

In foreign policy, he negotiated a trade pact with China. Despite calls for renewed détente, Chernenko did little to prevent the escalation of the Cold War with the United States. For example, in 1984, the Soviet Union prevented a visit to West Germany by East German leader Erich Honecker. However, in late autumn of 1984, the U.S. and the Soviet Union did agree to resume arms control talks in early 1985. In November 1984 Chernenko met with Britain's Labour Party leader, Neil Kinnock.

In 1980, the United States led an international boycott of the Summer Olympics held in Moscow in protest at the Soviet invasion of Afghanistan. The following 1984 Summer Olympics were due to be held in Los Angeles, California. On 8 May 1984, under Chernenko's leadership, the USSR announced its intention not to participate in the Games, claiming "security concerns and chauvinistic sentiments and an anti-Soviet hysteria being whipped up in the United States". The boycott was joined by 14 Eastern Bloc satellites and allies, including Cuba (but not Romania). The action was widely seen as revenge for the U.S.-led boycott of the Moscow Games. The boycotting countries organised their own "Friendship Games" in the summer of 1984.

Before his death, Chernenko signed preliminary documents stating that on 9 May 1985, on the day of the 40th Victory Day Parade, the city of Volgograd would be renamed to Stalingrad. In his letter to Stalin's daughter Svetlana Alliluyeva, he wrote about "the upcoming restoration of justice in relation to the memory and heritage of I.V. Stalin", which presumably referred to Stalin's political rehabilitation.

Health problems, death and legacy

Chernenko started smoking at the age of nine, and he was always known to be a heavy smoker as an adult. Long before his election as general secretary, he had developed emphysema and right-sided heart failure. In 1983 he had been absent from his duties for three months due to bronchitis, pleurisy and pneumonia. Historian John Lewis Gaddis described him as "an enfeebled geriatric so zombie-like as to be beyond assessing intelligence reports, alarming or not" when he succeeded Andropov in 1984.

In early 1984, Chernenko was hospitalized for over a month but kept working by sending the Politburo notes and letters. During the summer, his doctors sent him to Kislovodsk for the mineral spas, but on the day of his arrival at the resort Chernenko's health deteriorated, and he contracted pneumonia. Chernenko did not return to the Kremlin until later in 1984. He awarded Orders to cosmonauts and writers in his office, but was unable to walk through the corridors and was driven in a wheelchair.

By the end of 1984, Chernenko could hardly leave the Central Clinical Hospital, a heavily guarded facility in west Moscow, and the Politburo was affixing a facsimile of his signature to all letters, as Chernenko had done with Andropov's when he was dying. Chernenko's illness was first acknowledged publicly on 22 February 1985 during a televised election rally in Kuibyshev Borough of northeast Moscow, where the General Secretary stood as candidate for the Supreme Soviet of the Russian SFSR, when Politburo member Viktor Grishin revealed that the General Secretary was absent in accordance with doctors' advice. Two days later, in a televised scene that shocked the nation, Grishin dragged the terminally ill Chernenko from his hospital bed to a ballot box to vote. On 28 February 1985, Chernenko appeared once more on television to receive parliamentary credentials and read out a brief statement on his electoral victory: "the election campaign is over and now it is time to carry out the tasks set for us by the voters and the Communists who have spoken out".

Emphysema and the associated lung and heart damage worsened significantly for Chernenko in the last three weeks of February 1985. According to the Chief Kremlin doctor, Yevgeny I. Chazov, Chernenko had also developed both chronic hepatitis and cirrhosis of the liver. On 10 March at 15:00, Chernenko fell into a coma and died later that evening at 19:20, aged 73. An autopsy revealed the cause of death to be a combination of chronic emphysema, an enlarged and damaged heart, congestive heart failure and liver cirrhosis. A three-day period of mourning across the country was announced. India, Iraq, Syria and Nicaragua all declared three days of mourning; Pakistan declared two days of mourning; East Germany and Czechoslovakia declared one day of mourning.

Chernenko became the third Soviet leader to die in less than three years. Upon being informed in the middle of the night of his death, U.S. President Ronald Reagan is reported to have remarked, "How am I supposed to get anyplace with the Russians if they keep dying on me?"

Chernenko was honored with a state funeral and was buried in the Kremlin Wall Necropolis, in one of the twelve individual tombs located between the Lenin Mausoleum and the Kremlin wall. He is the last person to have been interred there.

The impact of Chernenko—or the lack thereof—was evident in the way in which his death was reported in the Soviet press. Soviet newspapers carried stories about Chernenko's death and Gorbachev's selection on the same day. The papers had the same format: page 1 reported the party Central Committee session on 11 March that elected Gorbachev and printed the new leader's biography and a large photograph of him; page 2 announced the demise of Chernenko and printed his obituary.

After the death of a Soviet leader it was customary for his successors to open his safe. When Gorbachev had Chernenko's safe opened, it was found to contain a small folder of personal papers and several large bundles of money; more money was found in his desk. It is not known where he had obtained the money or what he intended to use it for.

Honors and awards
 Hero of Socialist Labour, three times (1976, 1981, 1984)
 Order of Lenin, four times (1971, 1976, 1981, 1984)
 Order of the Red Banner of Labour, three times (1949, 1957, 1965)
 Medal "For Valiant Labour in the Great Patriotic War 1941–1945" (1945)
 Jubilee Medal "In Commemoration of the 100th Anniversary of the Birth of Vladimir Ilyich Lenin" (1969)
 Jubilee Medal "Thirty Years of Victory in the Great Patriotic War 1941–1945" (1975)
 Jubilee Medal "60 Years of the Armed Forces of the USSR" (1978)
 Lenin Prize (1982)
 USSR State Prize (1982)
 Order of Karl Marx (East Germany)
 Order of Georgi Dimitrov (Bulgaria)
 Order of Klement Gottwald (Czechoslovakia)
 Order of Sukhbaatar (Mongolia)

Personal life
Chernenko had a son with his first wife, Faina Vassilyevna Chernenko, named Albert. With his second wife, Anna Dmitrevna Lyubimova, who married him in 1944, he had two daughters, Yelena and Vera, and a son, Vladimir. In 2015, archival documents were published, according to which Chernenko had many more wives, and many more children with them; this circumstance, perhaps, was the reason for the slowing of Chernenko's career growth in the 1940s.

Notes

References

Sources
 
 
 
 
 Ostrovsky, Alexander (2010). Кто поставил Горбачёва? (Who put Gorbachev?)  — М.: Алгоритм-Эксмо, 2010. — 544 с. ISBN 978-5-699-40627-2.
 
 
 Volkogonov, Dmitri. (1998), The Rise and Fall of the Soviet Empire. pp 383–431.
 Zemtsov, Ilya. Chernenko: The Last Bolshevik: The Soviet Union on the Eve of Perestroika (1989), 308p. covers 1970 to 1985.

External links

 Human Rights in Soviet Society by Chernenko.
 Soviet Democracy: Principles and Practice by Chernenko.

1911 births
1985 deaths
Burials at the Kremlin Wall Necropolis
Deaths from cirrhosis
Deaths from emphysema
Heads of the Communist Party of the Soviet Union
Heads of state of the Soviet Union
Heroes of Socialist Labour
Lenin Prize winners
Members of the Supreme Soviet of the Soviet Union
People from Krasnoyarsk Krai
People from Yeniseysk Governorate
People of the Cold War
People of the Soviet–Afghan War
Politburo of the Central Committee of the Communist Party of the Soviet Union members
Presidents of the Organising Committees for the Olympic Games
Recipients of the Order of Georgi Dimitrov
Recipients of the Order of Lenin
Recipients of the Order of the Red Banner of Labour
Recipients of the USSR State Prize
Russian people of Ukrainian descent
Soviet atheists
Soviet border guards
Soviet politicians